= Flugplatz =

Flugplatz may refer to:

- Flugplatz (corner) of the Nürburgring raceway
- Aerodrome
